Cobalt(II) thiocyanate is an inorganic compound with the formula Co(SCN)2. It is a layered coordination complex and its trihydrate Co(SCN)2(H2O)3 is used in the cobalt thiocyanate test (or Scott test) for detecting cocaine. The test has been responsible for widespread false positives and false convictions.

Structure and preparation

The structures of Co(SCN)2 and its hydrate Co(SCN)2(H2O)3 have been determined using X-ray crystallography. Co(SCN)2 forms infinite 2D sheets in the mercury(II) thiocyanate structure type, where as Co(SCN)2(H2O)3 consists of isolated tetrahedral Co(SCN)2(H2O)2 centers and one equivalent of water of crystallization.

The hydrate may be prepared by the salt metathesis reactions, such as the reaction of aqueous cobalt(II) sulfate and barium thiocyanate to produce a barium sulfate precipitate, leaving the hydrate of Co(SCN)2 in solution:

CoSO4  +  Ba(SCN)2  →  BaSO4  +  Co(SCN)2
or the reaction of the hexakisacetonitrile cobalt(II) tetrafluoroborate and potassium thiocyanate, precipitating KBF4

[Co(NCMe)6](BF4)2 + 2KSCN  →  2KBF4  +  Co(SCN)2.

The anhydrate can then be prepared via addition of diethylether as an antisolvent.

Cobalt thiocyanate test
Detailed procedures for the cobalt thiocyanate test are available. The reagent consists of 2% cobalt thiocyanate dissolved in dilute acid. Glycerol is often added to stabilise the cobalt complex, ensuring it only goes blue when in contact with an analyte and not due to drying.

Addition of the cobalt thiocyanate reagent to cocaine hydrochloride results in the surface of the particles turning a bright blue (faint blue for cocaine base). The solution changes back to pink upon adding some hydrochloric acid. Addition of chloroform, results in a blue organic layer for both cocaine hydrochloride and cocaine base. Diphenhydramine and lidocaine also give blue organic layers. These compounds are known false positives for cocaine. Lidocaine is commonly used to adulterate or mimic cocaine due to its local anaesthetic effect.

If the procedure is adjusted to basify the sample rather than acidifying it, the test can be used to test for ketamine hydrochloride.

References

Thiocyanates
Cobalt(II) compounds
Chemical tests
Drug testing reagents
Cocaine